Dağ Quşçu (also, Dağquşçu, Dagkushchu, Verkhniye Kushchi, and Yukhary-Kushchi) is a village and municipality in the Siazan Rayon of Azerbaijan.  It has a population of 539.  The municipality consists of the villages of Dağ Quşçu and Əlməkolu.

References 

Populated places in Siyazan District